Pevita Cleo Eileen Pearce or better known as Pevita Pearce (born October 6, 1992) is an British-Indonesian actress and model of mixed Welsh and Banjar descent.

Personal life
Pevita Pearce was born in Jakarta on 6 October 1992. She is the second child of three of Bramwell Pearce from Wales, and Ernie Auliasari from Banjarmasin. Pevita Pearce continued her study in New York City

Filmography

Films

Television

Music videos 
2007
 Kesempatan Kedua (Tangga) 
2009
 Cinta Sampai di Sini (single, D'Masiv)
2010
 Cemburu Menguras Hati (single, Vidi Aldiano)
2011
 Sakit Hati (Piyu single) 
2012
 Bunga Terakhir (Afgan single) 
 Hidup Untukmu Mati Tanpamu (Noah single)

Awards and nomination

References

External links 

 

1992 births
Actresses from Jakarta
Indo people
Banjar people
Indonesian Muslims
Indonesian people of British descent
Indonesian people of Welsh descent
21st-century Indonesian actresses
Living people